Mujer Comprada is the title of a Spanish-language telenovela produced by the Mexican television network TV Azteca. It marks the return of actress Cristian Bach to the television screen.

Cast

Main cast 
 José Ángel Llamas - Miguel Angel Diaz
 Andrea Martí - Angelica Valdez
 Gabriela Vergara - Laura Herrera
 Bernie Paz - Franco Rossi
 Saby Kamalich - Giovanna
 Héctor Bonilla - Abelardo Diaz
 Montserrat Ontiveros - Consuelo
 Martha Mariana Castro - Ofelia

Secondary cast

 Miriam Higareda - Francisca 'Francis' Valdez
 Rodrigo Cachero - Cosme Herrera
 Cynthia Rodríguez - Susana 'Susa'
 Erick Chapa - Alfonso Diaz-Lozano
 Luis Yeverino - Daniel
 Claudia Lobo - Regina
 Cecilia Piñeiro - Jenny (Villana)
 José Carlos Rodríguez - Padre Lucas
 Sandra Quiroz - Sofía 'Sofi'
 Guillermo Quintanilla - Álvaro
 Patrick Fernández - 'Chícharo'
 Matías Novoa - Germán
 Cristal Uribe - Silvia
 Luis Cárdenas - Bosco
 María José Rosado - Julia
 Tatiana del Real - Tabata
 Natalie Schumacher- Luisa
 Surya Macgregor- Lorena
 Francisco Porras
 Patricia Vásquez- Mariana
 Victor Luis Zuñiga- Mario
 Paco Mauri - Don Manuel

References

2009 telenovelas
2009 Mexican television series debuts
2010 Mexican television series endings
Mexican telenovelas
TV Azteca telenovelas
Mexican television series based on Argentine television series
Spanish-language telenovelas